Bunny hop can refer to:

Bunny hop (dance), a novelty dance from the 1950s
Bunny hopping, in video games, a technique used to increase movement speed and control
Bunny hop (cycling), in cycling, a trick that involves the rider lifting their bike over an obstacle while remaining on the bike and in motion
Bunny hop jump, in figure skating, typically the first jump learned by beginning skaters